N87 may refer to:
 N87 (Long Island bus)
 , a submarine of the Royal Navy
 London Buses route N87
 N87 road (Ireland)
 Nebraska Highway 87, in the United States
 Trenton–Robbinsville Airport, in Mercer County, New Jersey, United States